GENIVI Alliance was rebranded as the Connected Vehicle Systems Alliance (COVESA) in October 2021 and operates under that name.
COVESA is a non-profit automotive industry alliance that develops reference approaches for integrating operating systems and middleware present in connected vehicles and the associated cloud services. 
The GENIVI Alliance was founded on March 2, 2009, by BMW Group, Delphi, GM, Intel, Magneti-Marelli, PSA Peugeot Citroen, Visteon, and Wind River Systems.

Structure 
The GENIVI structure contains the following:
 Board of Directors
 Project Management Office (PMO)
 System Architecture Team
 Expert Groups
 GENIVI open source software project

The board consists of Founding Charter and Charter members, and a small number of elected Core members.

Each of the Expert Groups is led by an Automotive OEM and supported by a Tier 1 supplier.

Goals 
GENIVI is an open development community collaboratively producing automotive software components, standard APIs, and a development platform for in-vehicle infotainment and connected vehicle solutions. Having introduced Linux and open source software approaches to the automotive software ecosystem, GENIVI provides OEMs and their suppliers new and more efficient methods of producing car software.  GENIVI focuses on delivering a GENIVI Development Platform (GDP) that equips both automotive and non-automotive developers to rapidly prototype new, innovative solutions in an automotive, embedded Linux context.

GENIVI manages a members-only GENIVI Compliance program based on the GENIVI Platform Compliance Specification which is released twice annually to GENIVI members.  More than 20 companies have successfully registered their IVI solutions as GENIVI Compliant.

Deliverables

GENIVI Development Platform (GDP) 

The primary deliverable from GENIVI is its open source, automotive development platform where prototypes and innovative IVI and connected vehicle solutions can be rapidly developed and tested in an open community. GDP runs on a number of professional automotive hardware platforms (Intel, Renesas, nVidia, Qualcomm) as well as low cost boards like the RaspberryPi 2/3. This makes the GDP a useful tool for both professional automotive developers and non-automotive developers needing a low-cost and fast way of developing automotive software.

Software architecture 
At the core of GENIVI deliverables is a software architecture consisting of functional requirements and the software components that implement them.  The Architecture is best described in the GENIVI Platform Compliance Specification, a members-only document that is updated twice a year.

Software components 
The GENIVI software architecture is composed of existing open source software components, but automotive-specific software is also implemented to complete the GENIVI architecture. This automotive-specific software respects the GENIVI license policy and is hosted in public open source projects. GENIVI has launched its own public open source project where they host the repositories of more than 80 software components including the ones listed below:
 AF_BUS D-Bus optimization: performance improvement for D-Bus IPC mechanism
 Audio manager: management of audio sources routing and mixing
 Infotainment layer manager: graphical layer management
 Diagnostic Log and Trace: Interface for automotive diagnostic
The software interfaces of GENIVI software components are defined using Franca IDL. Based on this formally defined interface description language, integration with
other platforms and standards can be established. This allows the interoperability of GENIVI systems and non-GENIVI systems. (e.g., an integration with the AUTOSAR standard is developed in 2014.)

Development baseline 
The GENIVI Alliance defines and maintains reference baselines. Those baselines are public open source software platforms listed as part of the GENIVI open source software projects. The goals of the GENIVI baselines are:
 to verify the GENIVI software architecture buildability
 to integrate the GENIVI software components together
 to verify the impact of the GENIVI software architecture on software dependencies and platform licenses
The GENIVI software baselines are compatible with both ARM and x86 architectures.

Compliance program 
The GENIVI compliance program evaluates and certifies the infotainment platforms against the GENIVI software architecture defined in the GENIVI Platform Compliance Specification. The GENIVI compliance program is a member benefit for GENIVI members.

The GENIVI Alliance has already registered multiple compliant platforms for each of the GENIVI software architecture releases.

Members 
GENIVI reached a peak of more than 160 members.

References 

Automotive software
Embedded Linux